Hoichoi is an Indian subscription video on-demand and OTT streaming service, owned by SVF Entertainment Pvt Ltd. It is the first OTT platform in India  focusing mainly on Bengali content. The name Hoichoi means excitement.

It focuses primarily on Bengali language films and entertainment contents, but also provides English subtitles and Hindi dubbing. Apart from its market in Bangladesh and India, it also caters to Bengali diaspora that account for a major share of its subscription users. It has about 600 film titles and over 125  original series. The platform also started creating original films and expanding the films and TV shows genre.

It was launched on 20 September 2017, operating on a subscription-based business model. It introduced a freemium plan in 2021.

Besides web and mobile, it is Chromecast and AirPlay-enabled and available on Apple TV, Amazon Fire TV, Android TV, Roku, Mi TV, LG Smart TV and Tizen.

Partnership

ViewLift is Hoichoi's technology partner that controls the brand's OTT space; media and entertainment distribution, consumption and monetization. SVF gave the mandate to ViewLift in October 2016 to maintain and develop the official website and app.

In 2017, SVF assigned its creative mandate to advertising agency Rediffusion Y&R. The brand name Hoichoi was suggested by it.

In 2020, HoiChoi partnered with Reliance Jio making its contents available for JioFiber and Jio set-top customers.

See also
 Shree Venkatesh Films
 Over-the-top media services in India
Hotstar

References

External links
Official Website

Companies based in Kolkata
Indian brands
Streaming media systems
Video on demand services
Indian companies established in 2017
2017 establishments in West Bengal